Athene Andrade (15 February 1908 –1973) was a British artist known for her paintings and lithographs.

Biography
Andrade studied at the Central School of Arts and Crafts in London and at both the Bromley School of Art and the Beckenham School of Art. She often painted and sketched actors and theatre scenes. She exhibited at the Royal Academy in London, with the New English Art Club, the Society of Women Artists and with the National Society of Painters, Sculptors and Engravers. Andrade lived in Bromley in Kent and for a time taught at schools in London. The Victoria and Albert Museum in London holds examples of her work.

References

External links

1908 births
1973 deaths
20th-century British women artists
Alumni of the Central School of Art and Design
Alumni of Ravensbourne University London